Brian Turner is a former Australian rules footballer who played with Collingwood and North Melbourne in the Victorian Football League (VFL).

See also
 Australian football at the 1956 Summer Olympics

Notes

External links 

Living people
1933 births
Australian rules footballers from Victoria (Australia)
Collingwood Football Club players
North Melbourne Football Club players
Old Paradians Amateur Football Club players